Ficus dammaropsis, called kapiak in Tok Pisin, is a tropical fig tree with huge pleated leaves  across and up to 90 cm (3 feet) in length. It is native to the highlands and highlands fringe of New Guinea. Its fruit, the world's largest figs (syconia), up to six inches (15 centimeters) in diameter, are edible but rarely eaten except as an emergency food. They are pollinated by the tiny wasp Ceratosolon abnormis. The young leaves are pickled or cooked and eaten as a vegetable with pig meat by highlanders.

The lowland form of this species found commonly below 900 meters is recognized as a distinct species, Ficus brusii.

The species can be found at the Melbourne Botanic Gardens, located in the ‘Yucca Bed’.

Cultivation 
With its bold tropical leaves and relative tolerance of cold, F. dammaropsis is cultivated as an ornamental tree in frost-free climates.

References

dammaropsis
Flora of New Guinea
Flora of Papua New Guinea
Flora of Western New Guinea
Garden plants of Australasia
Ornamental trees